Martín de Azpilcueta (Azpilkueta in Basque) (13 December 1491 – 1 June 1586), or Doctor Navarrus, was an important Spanish canonist and theologian in his time, and an early economist who independently formulated the quantity theory of money in 1556.

Life 
He was born in Barásoain, Navarre, and was a relative of Francis Xavier. He obtained a degree in theology at Alcalá, then in 1518 he obtained a degree of doctor in canon law from Toulouse in France. Beginning in 1524, Azpilcueta served in several canon law chairs at the University of Salamanca. From 1538 to 1556, he taught at Coimbra University in Portugal, at the invitation of the kings of Portugal and Spain.

At the age of eighty he went to Rome to defend his friend Bartolomé Carranza, Archbishop of Toledo, accused before the Tribunal of the Inquisition. Though he failed to exculpate the Archbishop, Aspilcueta was highly honoured at Rome by several popes, and was looked on as an oracle of learning and prudence. His humility, disinterestedness, and charity were proverbial.

Azpilcueta died in Rome at the age of 94. He is buried in the national Church of San Antonio de' Portoghesi. Among other lives of Azpilcueta there is one by his nephew, prefixed to the Roman edition of his works.

Works 

His Manual de confesores y penitentes (1549), originally written in Spanish, was enormously influential in the fields of canon law and ethics, and by the first quarter of the seventeenth century, it had gone through 81 editions. The Manual made an important step in the development of moral theology as its own discipline. One of the four appendices Azpilcueta wrote for the Manual, addressing exchange, supply and demand, and money, has recently been translated into English and published as On Exchange (2014). 

In this work, Azpilcueta argued that the use of "money in exchanges is not unnatural," as Aristotle had claimed, and "put money on the same level as any other merchandise, and, consequently, established that the morality of exchanges did not depend on money as their object but on an equitable exchange." In his work on the revenues of benefices, first published in Spanish (Salamanca, 1566), translated into Latin (1568), and dedicated to Philip II of Spain and Pope Pius V, he maintained that beneficed clergymen were free to expend the fruits of their benefices only for their own necessary support and that of the poor.

In the face of use by the reformed Church of natural languages in their liturgy and divulgation, the Catholic Counter-Reformation reacted by hanging onto Latin. On the other hand, Azpilcueta supported the use of vernaculars in his 1545 Commento en Romance released in Coimbra, writing down the prayers Our Father, Hail Mary, and Creed both in Latin and Romance, i.e. Castilian, coming up against the opposition of the defenders of the Latin tradition. 

Later, he had to explain in his 1586 Miscellaneum centum that vernaculars had been used before, as approved by bishops and inquisitors, citing "a pious and knowledgeable Cantabrian", referring to Sancho de Elso from Estella, who had used Basque in different prayers. He partially put down the unfamiliarity of "the rustic dwellers and highlanders" with the Christian teachings to the use of Latin, "instead of their native language, learning them by heart".    

He wrote numerous other works, e.g. on the Breviary, the regulars, ecclesiastical property, the jubilee year, etc. A complete edition of his works was printed at Rome in 1590 (3 vols. fol.); also at Lyons, 1590; Venice, 1602; and Cologne, 1615 (2 vols. fol.). A compendium of his writings was made by J. Dastellanus (Venice, 1598).

Other works

Time Value of Money 
Azpilcueta allegedly invented the mathematical concept of the time value of money.

See also 
 Doctrine of mental reservation
 Equivocation
 Tomás de Mercado, another "Iberian monetarist"
 Pedro Agerre Azpilikueta, Basque prominent writer and maternal relative

References 

 Giraud, Bibli. Sacr., II 334-336 (gives list of his writings)
 Hugo von Hurter, Nomenclator, (1892), I, 124-127
 Azurmendi, Joxe (2015): "Nafarroatik Nafarroara" in Pruden Gartzia: Nafarroako auziaz, Donostia: Elkar. 
Attribution
 

1491 births
1586 deaths
Canon law jurists
16th-century Spanish Roman Catholic theologians
Spanish economists
Mercantilists
16th-century male writers
16th-century economists
University of Salamanca alumni
Academic staff of the University of Salamanca
School of Salamanca
16th-century Spanish philosophers
16th-century Spanish jurists